Leslie Gooday OBE (1921–2013) was a British architect.

Biography
Gooday was born in the former Croydon registration district of Surrey on 14 June 1921.
Elected to the Royal Institute of British Architects in 1951, he assisted Hugh Casson in designing the boating-pool and leisure area at the 1951 Festival of Britain on London's South Bank.

He designed, in 1961, the Grade II listed  Richmond Baths, now known as Pools on the Park, a swimming pool and leisure facility in Old Deer Park in Richmond, London. Completed in 1966, it received a Civic Trust award in 1967 and is recognised by Historic England as illustrating "the more ambitious use of glazed curtain walling and the post-Wolfenden Report emphasis on providing large banks of spectator seating".

His architectural practice, Leslie Gooday & Associates, based in East Molesey, Surrey, was appointed in 1967 to design the British pavilion at the Japan World Exposition at Osaka in 1970.

In 1956 he designed two houses in post-war modernism in Ham Farm Road, Ham, London which were cited by Nikolaus Pevsner as representative of the "quiet elegance of the modern style of the fifties". He also designed houses in other parts of the London Borough of Richmond upon Thames, the London Borough of Croydon, Surrey and East Sussex. The Bosphorus House in Kippington Road, Sevenoaks, Kent, that he designed in the 1960s, was described in the local volume of The Buildings of England in 1983 as "ingenious".  He made alterations to the Latter-day Saint church building in Balham, London, in 1979–80.

He died on 16 March 2013.

Personal homes
Gooday designed the two homes in which he lived successively with his wife Rosemary and children:
36 West Temple Sheen, East Sheen, London
Longwall (built 1964–66) St George's Hill, Weybridge, Surrey – described in its statutory listing in the initial (Grade II) category as "perhaps his most successful work".

Note

References

Sources
 

1921 births
2013 deaths
20th-century English architects
Architects from London
Officers of the Order of the British Empire
People from the London Borough of Croydon
21st-century English architects